NASCAR 3D: The IMAX Experience is an IMAX documentary film that was released on March 12, 2004, and distributed by Warner Bros. Pictures. It was the first IMAX film  to be distributed by Warner Bros. The film, directed by Simon Wincer and narrated by Kiefer Sutherland, provides an educational overview of the origins, evolution, and current state of the American motorsport NASCAR. It also explains how the sport works, from the rules, to the aerodynamics, the various tasks the teams take on to prepare for each race weekend, and the risks NASCAR drivers experience during every race.

While a small amount of the film uses archival TV broadcast footage of NASCAR races from the past, several scenes were filmed with IMAX cameras at actual NASCAR Winston Cup Series races during the 2003 season. Other racing scenes, which did not take place during actual races, had cameras on, or in the race cars, or on the track. The film was advertised to be sponsored by AOL for Broadband. The #30 Winston Cup Series Chevrolet Monte Carlo race car of Jeff Green– which was primarily sponsored by AOL during the 2003 season– is prominently featured in various shots of the film, as well as its promotional material. In the 2004 Cup Series season, the same car, then-driven by Johnny Sauter, had a special design to promote the film at the March 7 race at Las Vegas Motor Speedway, and once more at the May 2 race at Infineon Raceway.

A soundtrack released alongside the film consisted of licensed songs and its original score by Eric Colvin.  Some time after its original run at IMAX theaters, NASCAR 3D was released on DVD, and included bonus features, such as a compilation of close finishes in the history of NASCAR's top three racing divisions- the Winston Cup Series, the Busch Series, and the Craftsman Truck Series.

References 

2004 documentary films
2004 films
2000s sports films
American auto racing films
American sports documentary films
IMAX documentary films
NASCAR mass media
Warner Bros. films
2000s English-language films
2000s American films